Shenzhen Bao'an International Airport (formerly Shenzhen Huangtian Airport)  is the airport serving Shenzhen, Guangdong Province. It is a hub for Shenzhen Airlines and Shenzhen Donghai Airlines and for cargo airline SF Airlines, and a focus city for China Southern Airlines and Hainan Airlines. The airport also serves as an Asian-Pacific cargo hub for UPS Airlines. The airport is undergoing major expansions with a second runway completed and opened in 2011 and a new terminal which opened in 2013.

It is one of the three largest airport hubs serving the Pearl River Delta, alongside Hong Kong International Airport and Guangzhou Baiyun International Airport. The airport also has direct ferry routes to Hong Kong International Airport, where passengers can transit without going through immigration and custom checks, akin to transit between two flights.

History
The airport was opened on 12 October 1991. Its first runway is 3400 m long and 45 m wide, and it has 53 parking spaces on its apron.

Shenzhen airport handled 49,348,950 passengers in 2018, according to Civil Aviation Administration of China, making it the fifth busiest in mainland China. The airport was also China's fourth busiest and world's 24th busiest airport in terms of cargo traffic, registering 1,218,502.2 tonnes of freight in 2018. In terms of passenger movements, Shenzhen airport was the 5th busiest airport in China in 2018.

Air China launched the first intercontinental air route out of Shenzhen, to Frankfurt Airport, Germany, on 21 May 2016.

Former terminals
Terminal A – for domestic flights (closed from 10pm 27 November 2013)
Terminal B – for domestic flights (closed from 10pm 27 November 2013)
Terminal D – for international flights (closed from 10pm 27 November 2013)
These terminals covered an area of 152,000 sq meters and consisting of 24 jetways. The International Terminal D was opened in December 2008. It had no air gates of its own, just airside bus service to distant positions around the airport.

Current terminal
This new terminal building was called "Terminal 3" from the beginning of construction until its formal opening. Soon after the decision of the closure of Terminals A, B and D, "Terminal 3" was renamed as it was the only terminal building in operation. The terminal was opened on 28 November 2013 after 4 years of planning and construction.

Further expansions
A new satellite concourse, designed by Aedas, is under planning and construction.

Airlines and destinations

Passenger

Cargo

Passenger transport facilities
The passenger transport facilities are divided into three parts: a main terminal building and two large corridors—1,050 meters long and 650 meters wide—that form a cross shape. The current terminal is three times the size of former Terminals A and B, with 450,000 square meters of floor space, 62 boarding gates and the ability to accommodate any type of plane in the world. The main building has four floors above ground and two floors underground. A connecting Ground Transport Center adjoins the terminal to the south. The main building's third floor is the waiting area for domestic and international flights, which depart from the east wing.

Ground Transportation Center
The baggage areas are a short walks away from the Ground Transportation Center (GTC), where passengers can take buses, taxis and Shenzhen Metro trains. The transportation center offers local and long-distance bus services on the first floor, with taxi and Airport Express Shuttle 330 bus services on the second floor. The underground floor connects with Airport Station on Metro Line 11. Bus M416 also provides a shuttle service to Hourui Station on Line 1. In the future, it will also connect to the Guangzhou-Dongguan-Shenzhen Intercity Railway, which is under construction.
Regular bus and minibus services links the Airport with the rest of the city. Intercity bus services to some other nearby cities such as Hong Kong and Dongguan are also available.

Local taxis, and often some taxis from Dongguan, can pick up passengers there from three designated waiting areas. These areas have the capacity to handle 21 taxi cabs picking up passengers simultaneously.

Metro / Rail

Airport station on Line 11 has direct link to the Ground Transport Center of the current Terminal, with eastbound service from the airport via Bao'an and Nanshan to Futian station, connecting with Futian railway station High Speed Rail services, and westbound service via Fuyong, Shajing and Songgang to Bitou.

There are also shuttle services connecting with Line 1 of the Shenzhen Metro. Non-stopping service M416 runs between Hourui Station and the new terminal.

Airport North Station on Line 11 is also built, under the site of future new Terminal project - "Terminal 4". However, Airport North Station is inaccessible to or from any of the airport facilities.  Line 20 (Shenzhen International Exhibition Center Conveyance Project) links Airport North Station on Line 11 with services to Chongqing Road, International Exhibition Center South, International Exhibition Center North and International Conference Center stations. Line 20 opened in December 2021.

Guangzhou–Shenzhen intercity railway is currently under construction, and planning to provide services from Shenzhen Airport Station and Shenzhen Airport North Station.

In the future, Shenzhen–Maoming High-Speed Railway and Hong Kong–Shenzhen Western Express Railway are planned to stop here.

Ferry
Fast ferries are available to Outer Harbour Ferry Terminal and Taipa Ferry Terminal in Macau plus to the Skypier Ferry Terminal at Hong Kong International Airport via the nearby Fuyong Pier. Free shuttle buses connect the Pier and the Airport.

Direct services to Hong Kong Island and Kowloon were suspended because the Terminals A & B's long distance from the ferry terminal made it unpopular for commuters. However, with the opening of Terminal C, direct services may be resumed because it is much closer.

Airport express shuttle bus

There are many bus routes between the airport and the urban area, most of them via expressways and only cost ￥10 yuan.

A future service connecting the airport with Shenzhen North station is expected to start when the new Terminal 3 opens as part of 5 new major airport express shuttle buses.

Cross-border buses
Buses currently run mostly via Shenzhen Bay Control Point to many destinations across Hong Kong, Kowloon and the New Territories.

Coach service is provided by Trans Island Limousine Service Ltd serving SZIA and Hong Kong, including Sheung Wan, Causeway Bay, Mong Kok (Prince Edward), Tsim Sha Tsui and Hong Kong International Airport.

A direct coach service, operated by Chinalink Bus Company, is available at Elements Mall in Hong Kong. Passengers may check-in for their flights at the bus terminal but luggage must still be carried to the airport by the passengers. The service operates from Kowloon station on the Airport Express (MTR) line direct to the Shenzhen International airport.

Shenzhen–Zhongshan Bridge
The planned Shenzhen–Zhongshan Bridge will directly connect Shenzhen Bao'an International Airport on the eastern side of the Pearl River Delta with the city of Zhongshan on the western side.

It will consist of a series of bridges and tunnels and will cut travel time from Shenzhen to Zhongshan to less than 30 minutes. Construction of the proposed  eight-lane link started in 2017, with completion scheduled for 2024.

Other facilities

Shenzhen Airlines is headquartered on the grounds of the airport. Jade Cargo International was headquartered on the sixth floor of the Shenzhen Airlines Flight Operations Building on grounds of Shenzhen Bao'an International Airport. Shenzhen Donghai Airlines has its head office in the Shenzhen Airlines facility on the airport property.

SF Airlines has its headquarters in the No.1 Freight Depot of the International Shipping Center.

Accidents and incidents
 China Southern Airlines Flight 3456 - Crashed while landing on May 8, 1997

See also

List of airports in China
List of airports in Guangdong province, from 1911-current (Zh-Wiki)

References

Further reading
 Hirsch, Max. "Simulating Global Mobility at Shenzhen “International” Airport" (Chapter 11). In: O’Donnell, Mary Ann, Winnie Wong, and Jonathan Bach (editors). Learning from Shenzhen. University of Chicago Press, 2017. Contents of the book available at University Press Scholarship Online.

External links

 
 Airport Domestic Flights Schedule: Shenzhen Domestic Arrival and Departure Airlines
 Transportation in Shenzhen Airport  And Shenzhen Transportation, Get There by Air

Airports in Guangdong
Transport in Shenzhen
Airports established in 1991
1991 establishments in China
Massimiliano Fuksas buildings
Bao'an District